Single-lens translucent (SLT) is a Sony proprietary designation for Sony Alpha cameras which employ a pellicle mirror, electronic viewfinder, and phase-detection autofocus system. They employ the same Minolta A-mount as Sony Alpha DSLR cameras.

Sony SLT cameras have a semi-transparent fixed mirror which diverts a portion of incoming light to a phase-detection autofocus sensor, while the remaining light strikes a digital image sensor. The image sensor feeds the electronic viewfinder, and also records still images and video on command. The utility of the SLT design is to allow full-time phase-detection autofocus during electronic viewfinder, live view, and video recording operation. With the advent of digital image sensors with integrated phase-detection, the SLT design is no longer required to accomplish this goal, as evidenced by cameras such as the Sony NEX-5R, Fujifilm X-100s, and Nikon 1, although the SLT design avoids having pixels unavailable for image formation due to their space on the sensor being occupied by a dedicated phase detection autofocus sensor.

The term "translucent" is a misnomer for the actual SLT design, which employs a pellicle mirror that is not translucent. Pellicle mirrors have been used in single-lens reflex cameras from at least the 1960s (see Canon Pellix) and in the Pentax EI2000/Hewlett Packard 912 digital SLR of 2000 which used an optical viewfinder and on-sensor contrast-detection focussing.

List of SLT cameras

All of the above cameras record 1920x1080 video at 60i/30p (NTSC regions) or 50i/25p (PAL regions), in MPEG-4, AVCHD or H.264 formats. The Alpha 65 and 77 also records video at 50p or 60p, and the Alpha 99II records 4k video at 100Mbit/s (using XAVC S) with full sensor read-out.

Source: summarised from the full comparison table at DP Review.

See also
 Digital single-lens reflex camera
 Sony ILCA camera

References